The Men's 50 km Walk event at the 2003 World Championships in Paris, France was held on Wednesday August 27, 2003, with the start at 07:50h local time.

Medalists

Abbreviations
All times shown are in hours:minutes:seconds

Intermediates

Final ranking

See also
Athletics at the 2003 Pan American Games - Men's 50 kilometres walk

References
Results
rediff

W
Racewalking at the World Athletics Championships